Comptonella is a plant genus endemic to New Caledonia in the family Rutaceae (subfamily Rutoideae). Molecular phylogenetic analyses suggest that this genus is nested in Melicope.

Species
, Kew's Plants of the World Online accepts eight species in the genus Comptonella:
Comptonella baudouinii 
Comptonella drupacea 
Comptonella fruticosa 
Comptonella glabra 
Comptonella lactea 
Comptonella microcarpa 
Comptonella oreophila 
Comptonella sessilifoliola

References

Zanthoxyloideae
Zanthoxyloideae genera
Endemic flora of New Caledonia